Margaux Henry (born 14 June 1997) is a French slalom canoeist who has competed at the international level since 2014.

She won two medals in the Mixed C2 event at the ICF Canoe Slalom World Championships with a gold in 2017 and a silver in 2018. Both with Yves Prigent.

World Cup individual podiums

References

French female canoeists
Living people
1997 births
Medalists at the ICF Canoe Slalom World Championships